The 2012 Korea Open doubles was a women's professional tennis tournament played on hard courts in Seoul, South Korea.

Natalie Grandin and Vladimíra Uhlířová were the defending champions, but they lost in the semifinals to first seeded and American pair Raquel Kops-Jones and Abigail Spears.
Kops-Jones and Spears went on to win the title by defeating Akgul Amanmuradova and Vania King 2–6, 6–2, [10–8] in the final.

Seeds

Draw

Draw

References
 Main Draw

Korea Open - Doubles
2012 Doubles